The Harrisburg Horizon were a professional basketball team based in Harrisburg, Pennsylvania, in the United States. The Horizon were a member of the Eastern Basketball Alliance.  From the 1998 season to 2015, the Horizon played their home games at Manny Weaver Gymnasium at Rowland Intermediate School. Their last home venue was Manny Weaver Gym at Rowland Middle School.

History

The Harrisburg Horizon are the most successful team of the Eastern Basketball Alliance, winning the championship seven years in a row beginning in 2002.

The on-court success is only part of the reason why the Horizon's seasons are a hit. Through the use of free basketball clinic, outreach programs, and player appearances, they are able to achieve their goal of becoming a visible and positive influence in their community. Horizon players and management speak to the area's youth on the importance of education and self-worth, blending the message of life skills with the sport of basketball.

The Horizon also look forward to continuing their relationship with local community organizations, giving them the opportunity to spread their message and raise funds for their cause at all home games. The Horizon have enjoyed a special affiliation at select home games with Special Olympics, the Harrisburg area YMCA, PA State Police Camp Cadet, Paxtonia Basketball Association, Sertoma, Hard to Guard Athletes, Tri-Communities Athletic Association, and more.

The Horizon looks is building on the foundation of success set in place over the years. For individuals and families, the Horizon remain one of the most affordable forms of entertainment in the area.

Season-by-Season Records

 Eight EBA championships (2002, 2003, 2004, 2005, 2006, 2007, 2008, 2014)

Lady Horizon

The Harrisburg Lady Horizon compete in the Women's Eastern Basketball Alliance (WEBA), winning three championships (2004, 2005, and 2006).

References

External links
 Harrisburg Horizon

Eastern Basketball Alliance
Basketball teams established in 1998
Sports in Harrisburg, Pennsylvania
Basketball teams in Pennsylvania
1998 establishments in Pennsylvania